St. Catherine's Cathedral may refer to:
 St. Catherine's Cathedral, Alexandria, Egypt
 St. Catherine's Cathedral, Utrecht, Netherlands
 St. Catherine's Cathedral, Kherson, Ukraine